Coral Reef Adventure is a documentary film released in 2003 to IMAX theaters. It was directed by Greg MacGillivray and narrated by Liam Neeson.

Embarking on a 10-month expedition through the islands of the South Pacific, husband and wife underwater photography-duo Michele and Howard Hall explore the declining reefs and failing health of the world's oceans. From Australia's Great Barrier Reef, to a friend's coral reef-sustained village in Fiji, the diving expeditions show a range of coral reefs, from flourishing ones filled with unusual and exotic inhabitants, to vast stretches of bleached coral decline which prompted the Hall's activism. Along their journey, scientists working to understand and save the reefs meet with the Hall's.

Jean-Michel Cousteau, son of the famed oceanographer Jacques Cousteau, also makes an appearance, as do well-known dive guide and singer Rusi Vulakoro,  brother of Vude singer Laisa Vulakoro, who guides the Halls in their dive adventure.

This documentary film is the third ecologically-themed IMAX production from director MacGillivray, after The Living Sea and Dolphins. Crosby Stills & Nash contribute to the film's soundtrack. The Giant Screen Theater Association named it the best film achievement of 2003.

References

External links 
 
 

2003 films
American short documentary films
IMAX short films
Documentary films about marine biology
Short films directed by Greg MacGillivray
2003 short documentary films
MacGillivray Freeman Films films
Sea adventure films
Films with underwater settings
IMAX documentary films
2000s English-language films
2000s American films